Montseny is a municipality and village in the Vallès Oriental comarca in Catalonia. As of 2014, the population was 332.

The village is located at the feet of the Montseny Massif. Also you can visit the Montseny Natural Park which is inside the Montseny Massif. This natural park was declared a Biosphere Reserve by UNESCO.

References

External links
  
 Government data pages 

Municipalities in Vallès Oriental